Any Machado Ortiz is a Brazilian politician and lawyer.

She was elected to the Legislative Assembly of Rio Grande do Sul as a state deputy in 2014 and re-elected in 2018.

References

1983 births
Rio Grande do Sul politicians
Living people
Members of the Legislative Assembly of Rio Grande do Sul